El Buitre Airport is a military airport just south of Arica, a Pacific coastal city in the Tarapacá Region of Chile.

There is distant rising terrain southeast of the airport.

See also

Transport in Chile
List of airports in Chile

References

External links
OpenStreetMap - El Buitre
OurAirports - El Buitre
SkyVector - El Buitre
FallingRain - El Buitre Airport

Airports in Tarapacá Region